Khanaspur is one of the tourist mountain resort towns of the Galyat area of Hazara region of the Khyber Pakhtunkhwa. Khanaspur is a settlement in the Ayubia area and is located in Abbottabad District in Khyber Pakhtunkhwa province of Pakistan. It also has the Punjab University Hostel. It also had the Bhutto House. During British rule it was occupied by a detachment of British infantry.

Geography 

Climate 
The average temperature during the months of June–September ranges from 21 °C to 26 °C with cool nights. During winter, snowfall is common with tropical alpine environment.

Hotels in Khanaspur 
 Canari Hotel 
 Safari Palace 
 Mount View Hotel 
 Metro Inn Hotel
Gohar Hotel
Mount View Hotel
Snow Hill Villas
Breeze Inn Guest House

References

Populated places in Abbottabad District
Hill stations in Pakistan
Galyat of Pakistan